Aaron DeVon Epps (born April 28, 1996) is an American professional basketball player for the Greensboro Swarm of the NBA G League. He played college basketball for the LSU Tigers, and has played overseas in France and Italy.

Early life and high school
Epps grew up in Ball, Louisiana and attended Tioga High School. As a junior, he averaged 18 points, 12 rebounds and six blocks per game and was named All-Cenla first team and was an honorable mention for the Class 4A all-state team. Epps committed to LSU over offers from Louisiana Tech, Memphis, Oklahoma State and Mississippi State.

College career
Epps played four seasons for the LSU Tigers. His playing time increased each year and he became the team's starting power forward during his junior season and averaged 6.2 points and 4.4 rebounds per game while starting 19 games. As a senior, Epps averaged 9.5 points and 5.5 rebounds per game.

Professional career

Northern Arizona Suns (2018–2019)
Epps was selected sixth overall in the 2018 NBA G League draft by the Northern Arizona Suns. He averaged 10.3 points and 6.7 rebounds over 48 games in his first professional season as Northern Arizona finished last in the Western Conference.

Élan Chalon (2019)
Following the end of the G League season, Epps signed with Élan Chalon of France's LNB Pro A on March 25, 2019. Elan Chalon terminated his contract on May 9, 2019. He averaged 6.0 points and 3.1 rebounds in eight games for Chalon.

Return to Northern Arizona (2019–2020)
Epps returned to Northern Arizona to start the 2019–20 G League season. On February 6, 2020, Epps posted 17 points, 10 rebounds and one steal in a 123–107 G League loss to the Stockton Kings. In 37 games for the Northern Arizona Suns, Epps averaged 10.2 points and 6.5 rebounds per game.

Cleveland Charge (2021)
For the 2020–21 season, Epps joined the Cleveland Charge of the G League. He played in 12 games, averaging 5.7 point and 4.8 rebounds per game.

Agribertocchi Orzinuovi (2021–2022)
For the 2021–22 season, Epps signed with Agribertocchi Orzinuovi of the Italian league Serie A2 Basket. He appeared in 11 games for the team, averaging 14.5 points, 10.8 rebounds, 1 block, and 1 assist per game. 

On January 5, 2022, Epps' NBA G League player rights were traded from the Charge to the Raptors 905.

New Taipei CTBC DEA (2022)
On February 12, 2022, Epps signed with New Taipei CTBC DEA of the T1 League. He played in 14 games, averaging 17.9 points and 9.1 rebounds per game while shooting 51% from the field and 39% from 3 point.

Raptors 905 (2022–2023)
On December 12, 2022, Epps signed a contract to join the Raptors 905.

Greensboro Swarm (2023–present)
On February 24, 2023, Epps was traded to the Greensboro Swarm.

References

External links
LSU Tigers bio
RealGM profile

1996 births
Living people
American expatriate basketball people in Canada
American expatriate basketball people in France
American expatriate basketball people in Italy
American expatriate basketball people in Taiwan
American men's basketball players
Basketball players from Louisiana
Canton Charge players
Élan Chalon players
Greensboro Swarm players
LSU Tigers basketball players
New Taipei CTBC DEA players
Northern Arizona Suns players
People from Ball, Louisiana
Power forwards (basketball)
Raptors 905 players
T1 League imports
Sportspeople from Rapides Parish, Louisiana